Without Words: Genesis (stylized GENESIS) is the fourth remix album by Bethel Music, and their eighteenth full-length overall. It is also the third installment of the Without Words series. It was released on November 15, 2019 through its own imprint label, Bethel Music. Seth Mosley and Lael collaborated on the production of the album.

Without Words: Genesis was positively received by critics and also attained commercial success, having debuted on the US Christian Albums at No. 6.

Background
On November 4, 2019, Bethel Music announced that they will be releasing Without Words: Genesis on November 15. The album is the third installment of the Without Words series, being preceded by Without Words (2013) and Without Words: Synesthesia (2015). The album is an instrumental collection which features the remixed versions of twelve renowned worship songs and seven original interludes. The remixed songs included hits from the Bethel Music community such as "Reckless Love", "Stand in Your Love" and "Raise a Hallelujah" as well as popular songs by other contemporary worship artists such as Hillsong Worship's "What a Beautiful Name" and Elevation Worship's "Do It Again".

Joel Taylor, the CEO of Bethel Music, spoke of how the album's soundscape is interwoven with the story of Creation, saying:

Critical reception

Jonathan Andre shared in his 365 Days of Inspiring Media review that Without Words: Genesis is an album which "hopefully peels back the layers of our own hearts and challenges ourselves into what we perceive worship music and what God wants us to see it as." Reviewing for The Christian Beat, Sarah Baylor stated that the album "gives the worshipper the freedom to worship in different ways," and concluded that it "features skillfully composed songs all while keeping the main theme of each and purposefully drawing the listener into worship." Jono Davies at Louder Than the Music opined that "Yes, the album in the main is reflective, but it also somehow at times has so much more going on. Not only does it have exciting sounds and moments, it also has creative, uplifting sounds that are enjoyable from the off, the album also has so much more to give than just being background music." Sight Magazine'''s Marcus Cheong gave a favourable review of the album, calling Without Words: Genesis "a confident expression of both praise and artistry."

Accolades

Commercial performance
In the United States, Without Words: Genesis launched at No. 6 on the U.S. Billboard'' Christian Albums chart dated November 30, 2019.

Track listing

Charts

Weekly charts

Year-end charts

Release history

References

2019 albums
Bethel Music albums